Mariya Igorevna Gromova (born 20 July 1984 in Moscow) is a former Russian competitor in synchronized swimming and a triple Olympic champion and now presenter for Channel One.

Mariya was a member of the Russian gold medal team at the 2004, 2008 and 2012 Olympics. She announced her retirement on 1 November 2012 and began working for Channel One on 1 January 2013.

References

External links
 The Official Website of the Beijing 2008 Olympic Games

Living people
Olympic gold medalists for Russia
Russian synchronized swimmers
Olympic synchronized swimmers of Russia
Synchronized swimmers at the 2004 Summer Olympics
Synchronized swimmers at the 2008 Summer Olympics
1984 births
Swimmers from Moscow
Olympic medalists in synchronized swimming
Synchronized swimmers at the 2012 Summer Olympics
Medalists at the 2008 Summer Olympics
Medalists at the 2012 Summer Olympics
World Aquatics Championships medalists in synchronised swimming
Synchronized swimmers at the 2011 World Aquatics Championships
Synchronized swimmers at the 2009 World Aquatics Championships

Medalists at the 2004 Summer Olympics